is a private junior college in the city of Gifu, Gifu, Japan.

History 
It was set up as a vocational school in 1984. The Junior college was established in 2009. It is coeducational.

Academic departments 
 Nursing
 Rehabilitation

External links
  

Universities and colleges in Gifu Prefecture
Educational institutions established in 2009
Japanese junior colleges
Private universities and colleges in Japan
2009 establishments in Japan